NGC 42 is a lenticular galaxy in the Pegasus constellation. It was discovered on October 30, 1864, by the German astronomer Albert Marth. It may be gravitationally interacting with the nearby NGC 41.

References

External links
 

Lenticular galaxies
0042
18641030
Pegasus (constellation)